House of Style is an MTV show that premiered in May 1989, focusing on America's growing fascination with the "supermodel" craze. The show focused on fashion, lives of models, the modeling industry, and topics such as eating disorders.

Overview
The show was produced by Edward Christiansen and directed by Joshua Homnick and Steve Paley and during its eleven-year run, featured a variety of hosts, most of whom were professional models, including original host Cindy Crawford, as well as Rebecca Romijn and Molly Sims, whom the show helped make into household names.  Following Crawford's six-year run, MTV cut the number of episodes ordered for each year after her departure until the show was reduced to a yearly special and then ultimately canceled in 2000.

Other hosts of House of Style included: Amber Valletta, Shalom Harlow, and Daisy Fuentes, while ex-Germs/Nirvana/Foo Fighters guitarist Pat Smear was featured in regular segments during Crawford's years as host.

Revival
The show was revived for one episode on March 21, 2009, with Bar Refaeli as the host and Chanel Iman as a correspondent.

The show returned to MTV.com as a web series on August 7, 2014, with rapper and model Iggy Azalea as the host.

References

External links
 
House Of Style Collection | MTV Style first 12 seasons of video online
 

1989 American television series debuts
2000 American television series endings
1980s American documentary television series
1990s American documentary television series
2000s American documentary television series
English-language television shows
Fashion-themed television series
MTV original programming